Arantxa Sanchis is a female professional English billiards and snooker player from India. She won a gold medal in the Women's Team event at the inaugural IBSF World 6-Red Snooker and Team Snooker Championship in Carlow, Ireland, on 6 October 2013. It was a historic first gold medal for Indian women's snooker at a World Championship. On 27 September 2015, she won the inaugural IBSF World Billiards Championship in Adelaide, Australia. This feat made her the only woman in the world to hold IBSF World titles in both billiards and snooker.

In addition, she won the bronze medal at the IBSF World Team Snooker Championship at Sharm el-Sheikh, Egypt, in July 2016. This was followed up by a bronze medal at the ACBS Asian 6 Red Snooker Championship at Fujairah, United Arab Emirates, in September 2016.

Sanchis was the best-performing Indian female cueist for the year 2019. She won a bronze medal at the ACBS Asian Snooker Championship at Chandigarh, India, in May 2019. This was followed up with another bronze medal at the IBSF World Women's Snooker Championship at Antalya, Turkey, in November 2019.

In recognition of her achievements in the sport, she was presented with the Phoenix Leading Lady Award 2020 for Personal Excellence in Sports organised by Phoenix Market City.

Prior to this she has won ten National and two Maharashtra State Championships. She made history and created a record by winning four titles at a single Nationals (Indore 2008). This made her the first-ever Indian cueist (male or female) to accomplish this feat. She won the National Senior Women's Billiards Championship in 2012 and 2015, and the National Six Red Snooker Championship in 2012. At 17 years of age, she represented India at the 2007 IBSF World Under-21 Snooker Championship, held at Goa and was a semi-finalist.

On 3 December 2015, Sanchis was conferred with the Shiv Chhatrapati Award – Maharashtra's highest sporting honor for her achievements in the sports of billiards and snooker.

Early life
Arantxa Lael Sanchis was born on 27 April 1990 in Mumbai, Maharashtra. She was named after the Spanish professional tennis player Arantxa Sánchez Vicario. Arantxa is the daughter of retired Indian Army officer, Colonel EJ Sanchis, an alumnus of the National Defence Academy (NDA), Khadakwasla who trained at the Indian Military Academy (IMA), Dehradun and served for around three decades in the Corps of Engineers of the Indian Army. He was the Commander in-charge of the Rescue Operation of the Orissa flood in the year 1999. He has represented NDA and Marathwada University in Cricket and Hockey. He has given her tremendous support in her sporting career and is currently her Coach, Manager and Mentor for the game. Her mother is Carolina Sanchis, who is an alumnus of St. Xavier's College Mumbai. She has an elder sister Amanda Sanchis, who is a head of administration and a talented writer.

Career beginnings
She started playing Snooker in 2005 at the age of 15. She  the first ball she aimed at. She was then studying in the X Std at the Army Public School, Pune. She would look for every opportunity to play and coaxed her father to take her. She started participating in the Annual tournament in Billiards and Snooker for the Army officers at CME and won both the Billiards and Snooker Championships in the year 2006. She then took part in a Pune Open Snooker tournament at PYC Hindu Gymkhana in which she won the opening frame of her very first competitive match by potting the last black against her older and more experienced male player. Arantxa plays both snooker and billiards at the International level.

Coaching
She had her basic coaching under late Shri Satish Amarnath; a renowned National and International Billiards and Snooker player. Her compact stance, smooth cue delivery and sharp potting skills were developed under him. She had a short stint with Thai Snooker player Phisit Chandsri, a 3-time IBSF World Snooker Masters Champion. He improved her break building ability and game strategy. At present, she is coached and mentored by her father.

Education
Arantxa has done her schooling from Army Public School, Pune. She holds a Bachelor of Engineering Degree in Information Technology from St. Francis Institute of Technology, University of Mumbai. She then went on to acquire an MBA in Finance and International Business from Symbiosis Institute of Management Studies under Symbiosis International University, Pune.

Sporting achievements
Sanchis has been a World and National Champion in Billiards.

In addition, she was a quarter-finalist at the below events: 
IBSF World 6 Red Snooker Championships:
Sharm el-Sheikh, Egypt (2017/2016/2014)
Karachi, Pakistan (2015)
IBSF World Snooker Championship:
Doha, Qatar (2017)

She has represented India at multiple world championships: 
WPBSA Professional World Billiards Championship: 
Leeds, UK (Oct 2012)
IBSF World Snooker Championship:
Sofia, Bulgaria (Nov 2012)
Daugavpils, Latvia (Nov 2013) 
Bangalore, India (Dec 2014)
Doha, Qatar (Nov 2016)

She represented Deccan Gymkhana, New Poona Club and Royal Western India Turf Club (RWITC) for various tournaments in Pune. She has also represented MCF Club and Catholic Gymkhana at the Mumbai Billiards & Snooker Leagues.

Sanchis' achievements at All India open tournaments include:

 CCI Open Snooker 2019 – Top 32 (Amongst men)
 Matunga Gymkhana 6 Red Open Snooker 2018 – Top 16 (Amongst men)
 ECC 6 Red Open Snooker 2018 – Top 32 (Amongst men)
 Matunga Gymkhana 6 Red Open Snooker 2016 – Quarterfinalist (Amongst men)
 Snooker Premier League 2016 - Runner-up (Team - Royal Strikers)

Academic achievements
Sanchis achieved a Distinction during her Engineering from St. Francis Institute of Technology, Mumbai. She was declared the Best Student of the institute.

She also topped her MBA in Finance from Symbiosis Institute of Management Studies, Pune. Here too, she was declared the Best Student of the institute.
In the year 2013, she was awarded with the Chancellor's Gold Medal of Symbiosis International University for all-round excellence in MBA among 5000 students across 10 Institutes in India. She won as many as 10 awards during her two years of the MBA Course. She was awarded the Sports scholarship for two years in a row by the university.

Awards and recognition
Sports:

Shiv Chhatrapati Award for the year 2013–2014 by Maharashtra Government
Best Sportsperson Award for the year 2012–2013 by Symbiosis International University
Awarded the Phoenix Leading Lady Award 2020 for Personal Excellence (Sports)
Most promising player at the Turf Club Open 2008
Featured in the 100 Women Special by BBC.
She was felicitated at the RWITC Pune Derby 2015 for her performance in Billiards and Snooker.

Academics:

Chancellor's gold medal for all-round excellence in Symbiosis International University 2013.
Overall Best Student Manager in MBA 2013.
S. B. Mujumdar Award for Commitment and Dedication 2013.
Best Internship Award 2013.
Army Silver Medal for Excellence in Finance 2013.
Army Silver Medal for Excellence in International Business 2013.
Best Student Manager in Engineering in the year 2011.

References

External links
 Arantxa gunning for a World snooker berth Times of India
 Indian women win team title in World Snooker Championship Times of India
 Indian National Billiards & Snooker Championship 2013 Gwalior – Madhya Pradesh Cue Sports India
 Information on Arantxa Sanchis
 Indian Express
 City Pluse Paper

Female snooker players
Female players of English billiards
Indian snooker players
Indian players of English billiards
1990 births
Living people
Sportswomen from Maharashtra
Sportspeople from Mumbai
Cue sports players from Maharashtra